Multiplex may refer to:
 Multiplex (automobile), a former American car make
 Multiplex (comics), a DC comic book supervillain
 Multiplex (company), a global contracting and development company
 Multiplex (assay), a biological assay which measures several components at the same time 
 Multiplex (highway) or concurrency, a single road designated by multiple highway numbers
 Multiplex (juggling), a juggling action with multiple balls thrown or caught at one time by the same hand
 Multiplex (movie theater), a theater with many screens
 Multiplex (webcomic), an online comic about the staff of a movie theater
 Multiplexing or multiplex communication, combining many signals into one transmission circuit or channel
 Multiplex (television), a group of digital television or radio channels that are combined for broadcast

See also
 Multiplex Modellsport, a manufacturer of radio control equipment and radio-controlled airplanes
 Multiplexer, an electronic device that performs multiplexing